The 2013 World Seniors Championship (Known for sponsorship reasons as the 888casino World Seniors Championship) was a snooker tournament that took place between 19 and 20 October 2013 at the Mountbatten Centre in Portsmouth, England.

Steve Davis won the event by defeating defending champion Nigel Bond 2–1 in the final.

Prize fund
The breakdown of prize money for this year is shown below:
 Winner: £18,000
 Runner-up: £8,000
 Semi-finalist: £4,000
 Quarter-finalist: £2,000
 Last 16: £1,000
 Total: £50,000

Main draw
The draw for the last 16 was made on 12 August 2013 at the Doncaster Dome in Doncaster during the qualifying stage of the 2013 Indian Open. The draw for the quarter-finals and semi-finals was made on a random basis. All matches were best of 3 frames and all frames were subject to a 30-second shot clock after ten minutes of play. All times are BST.  The highest break of the tournament was 94 made by Steve Davis.

Last 16 

 Saturday, 19 October – 13:00
  Dene O'Kane 0–2  Nigel Bond
  Tony Knowles 1–2  Darren Morgan
  Tony Drago 0–2  Dave Harold
  Steve Davis 2–0  Dennis Taylor

 Saturday, 19 October – 19:00
  Doug Mountjoy 0–2  Jimmy White
  Alain Robidoux 1–2  Tony Chappel
  Cliff Thorburn 2–0  Philip Williams
  Joe Johnson 0–2  Stephen Hendry

Quarter-finals
 Sunday, 20 October – 13:00
  Cliff Thorburn 1–2  Nigel Bond
  Darren Morgan 0–2  Dave Harold
  Tony Chappel 1–2  Steve Davis
  Jimmy White 1–2  Stephen Hendry

Semi-finals
 Sunday, 20 October – 19:00
  Dave Harold 1–2  Steve Davis
  Stephen Hendry 0–2  Nigel Bond

Final
 Sunday, 20 October – 19:00
  Steve Davis 2–1  Nigel Bond

Qualifying
These matches were held on 3 October 2013 at the Barnsley Metrodome in Barnsley, England. There was only one century break during the qualifying. Philip Williams made a 100 break against Karl Townsend.

References

2013
2013 in snooker
2013 in English sport
October 2013 sports events in the United Kingdom
Sport in Portsmouth